Love Is Rain is the seventh full-length studio album released by American band The Badlees. It was released on S.A.M. Records on October 6, 2009, the band's first new album in over seven years.

Track listing

Personnel
The Badlees
 Bret Alexander – Guitars, Keys, Vocals
 Pete Palladino – Vocals
 Paul Smith – Bass, Keys, Vocals
 Ron Simasek – Drums, Percussion
Additional Musicians
 Jeff Feltenberger - Backing Vocals
 Aaron Fink - Guitar on "Part of a Rainbow"
 Nick Van Wyke - Violin on "We Will"
Production
 Bret Alexander - Producer, Engineer
 Chris Gradner - Executive Producer
 Paul Smith - Engineer
 Pete Palladino - Layout & Design

References
Modern Rock Review Badlees Profile, October 10, 2010
"Two States" by Sigourney Soul & Karyn Albano, DAMESofPA.com, November 5, 2009
The Badlees Archives by Alan K. Stout

2009 albums
The Badlees albums